John Marsh (fl. 1394–1397) of Bath, Somerset, was an English politician.

He was a Member (MP) of the Parliament of England for Bath in 1394, 1395 and January 1397. He married a woman named Edith and they had one daughter.

References

Year of birth missing
Year of death missing
English MPs 1394
People from Bath, Somerset
English MPs 1395
English MPs January 1397